On 25 May 2003, a Boeing 727, registered N844AA, was stolen at Quatro de Fevereiro Airport, Luanda, Angola, prompting a worldwide search by the Federal Bureau of Investigation (FBI) and Central Intelligence Agency (CIA). No trace of the aircraft has since been found.

Background
The aircraft involved was a Boeing 727-223 manufactured in 1975 and formerly operated by American Airlines for 25 years. Its last owner was reported to be a Miami-based company called Aerospace Sales & Leasing. The aircraft had been grounded at Quatro de Fevereiro Airport, Luanda, and sat idle for 14 months, accruing more than $4 million in unpaid airport fees. It was one of two aircraft at the airport that were in the process of being converted for use by IRS Airlines. The FBI described it as "...unpainted silver in color with a stripe of blue, white, and red. The [aircraft] was formerly in the air fleet of a major airline, but all of the passenger seats have been removed. It is outfitted to carry diesel fuel."

Incident
On May 25, 2003, shortly before sunset (likely to be 17:00 local time), it is believed that two men boarded the aircraft. One of them was an American pilot and flight engineer Ben C. Padilla. The other, John M. Mutantu, was a hired mechanic from the Republic of the Congo. Neither man was certified to fly a Boeing 727, and needed an additional crew member to fly the aircraft. Padilla is believed by U.S. authorities to have been at the controls. An airport employee reported seeing only one person on board the aircraft at the time; other airport officials stated that two men had boarded the aircraft before the incident.

The aircraft began taxiing without communicating with the control tower. It maneuvered erratically and entered a runway without clearance. The tower officers tried to make contact, but there was no response. With no lights, the aircraft took off, heading southwest over the Atlantic Ocean before disappearing. Neither the aircraft nor the two men have been seen since and no debris from the aircraft has been found on land or sea.

Theories
Padilla's sister, Benita Padilla-Kirkland, told the South Florida Sun-Sentinel in 2004 that her family suspected that he had been flying the aircraft and feared that he subsequently crashed somewhere in Africa or was being held against his will; a theory with which Aerospace Sales & Leasing president Maury Joseph, who had examined the plane two weeks before its disappearance, agreed. However, U.S. authorities have suspected that Joseph's history of accounting fraud played a part, believing that the plane's theft was either caused by a business feud or resulted from a scam.

In July 2003, a possible sighting of the missing aircraft was reported in Conakry, Guinea, but was conclusively dismissed by the U.S. State Department.

Reports made public as part of the 2010 United States diplomatic cables leak indicate that the U.S. searched for the aircraft in multiple countries following the event. A Regional Security Officer searched for the aircraft in Sri Lanka without success. A ground search was also conducted by diplomats stationed in Nigeria at multiple airports without finding it. The telegram from Nigeria also stated that the diplomats did not consider likely a landing of the 727 at a major airport as the aircraft could have been easily identified.

An extensive article published in Air & Space Magazine in September 2010 was also unable to draw any conclusions on the whereabouts or fate of the aircraft, despite research and interviews with persons knowledgeable of details surrounding the disappearance.

See also 
List of missing aircraft
List of people who disappeared
2018 Horizon Air Q400 incident, in which a Bombardier Dash 8-Q400 was stolen from Seattle-Tacoma International Airport and crashed into Ketron Island
1990 Faucett Perú 727 disappearance, another instance of a 727 disappearance
Varig Flight 967
Malaysia Airlines Flight 370
Flying Tiger Line Flight 739

References 

2000s missing person cases
Accidents and incidents involving the Boeing 727
Airliner accidents and incidents with an unknown cause
Angola 727 disappearance
Missing aircraft
Angola 727 disappearance
727 disappearance
Angola 727 disappearance
Unsolved crimes in Angola